Matteo Carcassi (8 April 1796 – 16 January 1853) was an Italian guitarist and composer.

Life
Carcassi was born in Florence, Italy, and first studied the piano, but learned guitar when still a child. He quickly gained a reputation as a virtuoso concert guitarist.

He moved to Germany in 1810, gaining almost immediate success. By 1815, he was living in Paris, earning his living as a teacher of both the piano and the guitar. On a concert tour in Germany in 1819, he met his friend Jean-Antoine Meissonnier for the first time. Also a well-known guitarist, Meissonnier published many of Carcassi's works in his Paris publishing house. For Meissonnier he also arranged a number of popular songs for guitar that were originally written for piano, including works by Théodore Labarre and Loïsa Puget.

From 1820 on, Carcassi spent the majority of his time in Paris. In 1823, he performed an extremely successful series of concerts in London that earned him great fame, both as a performing artist and as a teacher. However, in Paris, a long time passed before his talents were truly recognized, partly because of the presence of Ferdinando Carulli.

Carcassi was in Germany again during autumn 1824. Afterwards he performed in London, where his reputation now gave him access to more prestigious concert halls. Finally he returned to Paris. For several years, he made concert trips from here to the important musical centres of Europe. After a short return to performing in 1836, he quit his concert practice around 1840 and died in Paris in 1853.

Music
Carcassi wrote a method for guitar (Op. 59), first published with Schott in Mainz, in 1836. It is still valuable, relevant and interesting. His most famous works are collected in his 25 Études, Op. 60. In these, he managed to blend technical skills and brilliant Romantic music. This is the reason his music is still played by so many classical guitarists today.

References

External links

Sheet music
Rischel & Birket-Smith's Collection of guitar music 1 Det Kongelige Bibliotek, Denmark
Boije Collection The Music Library of Sweden

Large collection of free sheet music by Carcassi from Cantorion.org.
Free scores Mutopia Project

1796 births
1853 deaths
19th-century classical composers
19th-century Italian male musicians
Composers for the classical guitar
Italian classical composers
Italian classical guitarists
Italian male classical composers
Italian male guitarists
Italian Romantic composers
Musicians from Florence
19th-century guitarists